Ramón Báez Romano (4 March 1929 – 7 March 2022) was a Dominican businessman, politician, and golfer. Coming from one of the most influential families in the Dominican Republic, he was Minister of Industry and Trade during the administration of President Antonio Guzmán. He was CEO of Rosario Dominicana, Baninter, and Listín Diario, among others.

Romano was born on 4 March 1929. He is a member of the Dominican Golf Hall of Fame. Romano died on 7 March 2022, three days after his 93rd birthday.

Ancestry
Báez was a descendant of Spanish conquistadors Rodrigo de Bastidas and Gonzalo Fernández de Oviedo y Valdés, the Dominican presidents Buenaventura Báez and Ramón Báez, and the Jesuit priest and historian Antonio Sánchez Valverde (who had an illegitimate son with a married woman).

References

1929 births
2022 deaths
Place of birth missing
Descendants of Buenaventura Báez
Dominican Republic people of Basque descent
Dominican Republic people of Catalan descent
Bank presidents and chief executive officers
Chief executives in the media industry
Dominican Republic billionaires
Dominican Republic male golfers
Dominican Revolutionary Party politicians
Government ministers of the Dominican Republic
White Dominicans